RSGC1-F02 is a red supergiant located in the RSGC1 open cluster in the constellation of Scutum. Its radius was calculated to be between 1,499 and 1,549 or 1,128 times that of the Sun (the radius is calculated applying the Stefan-Boltzmann law), making it one of the largest stars discovered so far. This corresponds to a volume 3.37 and 3.72 billion times bigger than the Sun. If placed at the center of the Solar System, its photosphere would engulf the orbit of Jupiter.

See also 
 RSGC1-F01

References 

Scutum (constellation)
M-type supergiants
TIC objects